The 1st constituency of Budapest is one of the single member constituencies of the National Assembly, the national legislature of Hungary. The constituency standard abbreviation: Budapest 01. OEVK.

Since 2018, it has been represented by Antal Csárdi of the LMP.

Geography
The 1st constituency is located in central part of Budapest.

The constituency borders with 7th constituency to the north, 5th and 6th constituency to the east, 2nd and 3rd constituency to the west.

List of districts
The constituency includes the following municipalities:

 District I.: Full part of the district.
 District V.: Full part of the district.
 District VIII.: Inner part (Palotanegyed) of the district.
 District IX.: Inner part (Belső-Ferencváros) of the district.

History
The 1st constituency of Budapest was created in 2011 and contained of the pre-2011 abolished constituencies of the part of 1st, 7th, 10th and 12th constituency of the capital. Its borders have not changed since its creation.

Members
The constituency was first represented by Antal Rogán of the Fidesz from 2014 to 2018. Antal Csárdi of the LMP was elected in 2018 and re-elected in 2022 (with United for Hungary support).

Election result

2022 election

2018 election

2014 election

Notes

References

Budapest 1st